Phiala infuscata is a moth in the family Eupterotidae. It was described by Karl Grünberg in 1907. It is found in Tanzania.

References

Endemic fauna of Tanzania
Moths described in 1907
Eupterotinae